Egyptian Hieroglyphs may refer to:

 Egyptian hieroglyphs, a formal alphabetic/logographic writing system of ancient Egypt
 Egyptian Hieroglyphs (Unicode block), a block of Unicode characters containing the characters of the Gardiner sign list